Anisothecium is a genus of mosses in the family Dicranaceae.

Species 

Anisothecium brachyangium
Anisothecium brachydontium
Anisothecium campylophyllum
Anisothecium capituligerum
Anisothecium clathratum
Anisothecium convolutum
Anisothecium cyrtodontum
Anisothecium elegans
Anisothecium globuligerum
Anisothecium gracillimum
Anisothecium grevilleanum
Anisothecium hioramii
Anisothecium hookeri
Anisothecium horridum
Anisothecium humile
Anisothecium javanicum
Anisothecium laxirete
Anisothecium lorentzii
Anisothecium macrostomum
Anisothecium madagassum
Anisothecium molliculum
Anisothecium nicholsii
Anisothecium palustre
Anisothecium planinervium
Anisothecium pseudorufescens
Anisothecium pycnoglossum
Anisothecium recurvimarginatum
Anisothecium rotundatum
Anisothecium rufescens
Anisothecium rufipes
Anisothecium ruttneri
Anisothecium schreberianum
Anisothecium skottsbergii
Anisothecium spirale
Anisothecium staphylinum
Anisothecium submacrostomum
Anisothecium ugandae
Anisothecium vaginatum
Anisothecium varium
Anisothecium yezoanum

References

External links 

Dicranales
Moss genera